Cacia batoensis is a species of beetle in the family Cerambycidae. It was described by Stephan von Breuning in 1956. It is known from Malaysia.

References

Cacia (beetle)
Beetles described in 1956